= No To Mob =

British campaign group

No To Mob is an organised campaign group that deploys teams to warn British motorists of the presence of closed circuit television (CCTV) parking enforcement camera vehicles.

The group's website proclaims them to be "a Campaign Group dedicated to regaining the voice of the Individual."

The group was featured in a BBC television documentary, Parking Mad, broadcast on 8 January 2013.

No To Mob is active in Southend-on-Sea, appearing on motorcycles and wearing face masks, to warn motorists of the location of active council CCTV cars.
